Wendy & Lisa (briefly known as Girl Bros.) are a music duo consisting of Wendy Melvoin and Lisa Coleman. They began working with Prince in the early 1980s and were part of his band the Revolution, before branching out on their own and releasing their eponymous debut studio album in 1987. In recent years they have turned their attention to writing music for film and television and have won an Emmy Award.

They have released five studio albums, with their most recent album being 2008's White Flags of Winter Chimneys.

History

With the Revolution
In 1980, Lisa Coleman replaced Gayle Chapman in Prince's touring band on keyboards and piano. Coleman was asked to contribute vocals to several tracks over his next few albums. In 1983, guitarist Dez Dickerson left the band over religious conflicts. Prince invited Wendy Melvoin (Lisa's girlfriend at the time) into the band as they began to record Purple Rain (1984). The film and album turned Prince and the newly named Revolution into superstars. Prince's personal life also became intertwined with Melvoin's when he began dating her twin sister Susannah.

After Purple Rain (1984), Prince and the Revolution recorded Around the World in a Day (1985) and then Parade (1986), the soundtrack to Prince's film Under the Cherry Moon (1986). In interviews, the two reported they felt they were not getting the recognition and credit they deserved despite their growing contributions to his work. During 1986, Melvoin and Coleman became increasingly disillusioned with Prince's decision to expand the Revolution with non-musicians, such as Wally Safford and Greg Brooks, and Prince's increasing machismo that these new members brought with them. Unhappy and vocal about their feelings, they were eventually convinced to remain with the band through the end of the Hit N Run - Parade Tour. However, Prince felt spurned and as a result he had already decided he would dissolve the Revolution once the tour was complete. Hence, by October 1986, Melvoin and Coleman (along with Bobby Z.) were dismissed by Prince, disrupting the Dream Factory album that was already completed and effectively dissolving The Revolution.

As Wendy & Lisa
In 1987 the duo released an album simply entitled Wendy and Lisa with Columbia Records in the US and on Virgin Records in the UK.  The singles released were Honeymoon Express, Waterfall and Sideshow but none hit the top 40 on either side of the Atlantic. The follow up album, Fruit at the Bottom, was released in 1989. The singles released were Are You My Baby?, Lolly Lolly (remixed by Prince) and Satisfaction, which finally gave them a Top 40 single in the UK.  Waterfall' 89 failed to capitalise on the success of Satisfaction and reached another minor placing.

In 1990, the duo signed with Virgin Records in the US (which was already their label in Europe) and released Eroica. However, this too met only minor chart success. In 1991, Virgin UK released the remix album Re-mix-In-a-Carnation, a selection of club mixes from the first three albums as remixed by producers like the Orb, William Orbit, and Nellee Hooper.

In the mid-1990s, Wendy & Lisa worked on several movie projects with record producer Trevor Horn. They recorded an album with him as producer, but had a falling out (according to them, due to Horn and his wife Jill Sinclair's alleged homophobia) and the project was shelved, leaving the master tapes in Horn's hands and acrimony between the parties involved.

Their next solo effort – the 1998 album Girl Bros. – was the first to be independently released, with all subsequent releases also self-released.

In 2004, the duo reached a rapprochement with Prince and contributed to several tracks on his Planet Earth (2007) album.

In December 2008, White Flags of Winter Chimneys was released. The title is taken from a line in the Joni Mitchell song "Hejira". 2011 saw the release of the Snapshots EP, which came with limited edition artwork, autographs and a photo book. It is a 6-track collection of songs that were recorded over the preceding 20 years of their careers but had previously never been released.

Session and scoring work

Melvoin and Coleman have done session work and/or written songs with Seal, k.d. lang, Joni Mitchell, Meshell Ndegeocello, Pearl Jam, Terence Trent D'Arby, Lisa Germano, Lisa Marie Presley, Liz Phair, Michael Penn, Grace Jones, Tricky, the Three O'Clock, Uh Huh Her, Sheryl Crow, Victoria Williams, Rob Thomas, Gwen Stefani, Skye Edwards, Scritti Politti, Nerina Pallot, OK Go, Madonna, The Like, Nina Gordon, fDeluxe, the Family, Doyle Bramhall II, Nikka Costa, André Cymone, Kate Earl, Eric Clapton, Bettye LaVette, Ilse DeLange, Mac Miller,  and Walk the Moon. Their vocals were featured on the soundtrack for Toys (1992).

Their first scoring project was for Dangerous Minds (1995). The team has scored numerous TV shows and films, including popular TV shows like Crossing Jordan, Heroes, Nurse Jackie and Firefly Lane.

Awards
Wendy & Lisa technically share the honor of winners of a Grammy and Oscar for being part of the Revolution, as Purple Rain (1984) won two Grammys, and the Oscar for Best Original Score. In 2010, they received the Emmy Award for Outstanding Original Main Title Theme Music for their work on Nurse Jackie. They received the ASCAP award for Composers of the Year for their work on Dangerous Minds (1995), the theme to HBO's Carnivàle, Crossing Jordan and Heroes. They were nominated for an Emmy in 2012 for the main title theme for the Fox show Touch.

Other projects
Melvoin and Coleman have made numerous contributions to television themes. They wrote theme music and background scores for TV shows such as Shades of Blue, Crossing Jordan, Bionic Woman, Carnivàle, Heroes, Mercy and Showtime's Nurse Jackie.

In 2001, they worked with Neil Finn on his second solo album, One Nil.

They have also been featured on several film scores and soundtracks, including Dangerous Minds (1995), Hav Plenty (1997), Something New (2006), and Wine Country (2019). The film Toys (1992) featured their song "The Closing of the Year", and they also produced the full-length Heroes: Original Score, released in April 2009, composed entirely of their full-length compositions for each of the show's characters. They scored the TV series Touch created by Crossing Jordan and Heroes creator, Tim Kring.

Melvoin and Coleman collaborated with Grace Jones for her 2008 album Hurricane.

Discography

Studio albums
Wendy and Lisa (1987), Columbia Records (UK No. 84)
Fruit at the Bottom (1989), Columbia Records (UK No. 45)
Eroica (1990), Virgin Records (UK No. 33)
Girl Bros. (1998), World Domination – Re-released as Wendy & Lisa "Girl Brothers Inc." (1999) (self-released)
White Flags of Winter Chimneys (2008), W. Melvoin/L. Coleman (self-released)

Extended plays
Snapshots (2011) (self-released)

Soundtracks
Toys (1992), Geffen Records
Heroes: Original Score (2009), La-La Land Records
Nurse Jackie: Season One Soundtrack (2010), Lionsgate Music
Dirty Girl Original Motion Picture Soundtrack (2010), Lakeshore Music

Singles

Compilation albums
Re-Mix-in-a-Carnation (1991)
Are You My Baby (1996)
Always in My Dreams (2000)

Contributions to Prince discography
The following songs, which appear on releases by Prince or associates, are registered with ASCAP as partial Wendy & Lisa compositions.
"17 Days", written by Prince, Wendy, Lisa, Dr. Fink
"America", written by Prince, Wendy, Lisa, Brown Mark, Dr. Fink, Bobby Z.
"A Million Miles (I Love You)", written by Prince, Lisa
"Computer Blue", written by Prince, Wendy, Lisa, Dr. Fink, John L. Nelson
"Mountains", written by Prince, Wendy, Lisa (US #23/UK #45)
"Power Fantastic", written by Prince, Wendy, Lisa
"Sometimes It Snows in April", written by Prince, Wendy, Lisa

Notes

References 
 Hahn, Alex (2003). Possessed: The Rise and Fall of Prince. New York: Billboard Books.
 Nilsen, Per (1999). Dancemusicsexromance: Prince – The First Decade. London: Fire Fly Publishing.
 Walters, Barry (2009). "The Revolution Will Be Harmonized: Recording duo – and former Prince and the Revolution members – Wendy & Lisa come out publicly for the first time." Out.com Features.

External links

Wendy & Lisa's Girl Bros. Radio at Live365

All-female bands
American musical duos
Rock music groups from California
American lesbian musicians
LGBT-themed musical groups
Musical groups established in 1986
1986 establishments in California
Female musical duos